Carole Umulinga Karemera (born 1975) is a Rwandan actress, dancer, saxophone player, and playwright.

Biography
She was born in 1975 in Brussels, the daughter of Rwandan exiles. As a child, Karemara excelled at mathematics and dreamed of opening a bakery. Karemera studied at the National Conservatory of Theater and Dance in Brussels. In 1994, her father, a journalist, returned to Belgium as a result of the Rwandan Genocide. Karemera first discovered Rwanda on a motorcycle in 1996. She performed in several plays, such as The Trojan Women by Euripides, The Ghost Woman by Kay Adshead, and Anathema, before starting her film career. Between 2000 and 2004, she played the leading role in Rwanda 94. Her uncle, Jean-Marie Muyango, composed the score for the show.

In 2005, Karemara starred as Jeanne in Raoul Peck's film Sometimes in April, about the Rwandan genocide. The same year, she decided to settle in Kigali. Upon moving to the country, Karemara became involved in cultural projects, including staging interactive plays in bars and in the streets of Rwandan cities, in order to create a common history. Along with Cécilia Kankonda, she set up a "sound cathedral" built from recordings of memories in which participants could tell their memories of Rwanda before 1994. In 2006, Karemara and seven other women established the Ishyo Arts Center in Kigali to support culture in the capital, which did not have a theatre until that point.

Karemara starred as Beatrice in the 2007 film Juju Factory. She received the Best Actress award at the Festival Cinema Africano in Italy. She wrote the play "Chez l’habitant", about the experiences of women in Brussels, Kigali and Sevran.

Karemara has served as the Deputy Secretary General of Arterial Network, as well as the Arterial Network Country Representative in Rwanda. She starred in Peter Brook's 2016 play Battlefield, based on The Mahabharata. In 2018, she received an award at the Les Journées théâtrales de Carthage, honoring her work in the theatre in Rwanda.

Filmography
2005: Sometimes in April as Jeanne
2006: Sounds of Sand as Mouna
2007: Juju Factory as Béatrice
2008: Black as Pamela

References

External links
Carole Karemera at the Internet Movie Database

1975 births
Living people
21st-century actresses
Rwandan actresses
Rwandan musicians
Actresses from Brussels